ABC Western Plains is an ABC Local Radio station based in Dubbo, New South Wales. The broadcast region stretches from Wellington north to Goodooga and west from Coonabarabran to Wilcannia. The station covers the top half of the Far West region and part of the Orana region of New South Wales.  This includes Dubbo City and the towns of Bourke, Cobar, Nyngan, Walgett, Mudgee, Lightning Ridge, Gilgandra, Coonamble and Warren

The station also provides services to isolated communities via satellite such as Ivanhoe, Menindee, Talbingo, Khancoban and even Norfolk Island.

ABC Western Plains began operating in 1993 taking over the western and outback region previously covered from Orange by ABC Central West.

In 2008 the station gained full regional status and is now self managed. This saw the establishment of a local morning show.

The station is heard on these main FM and AM frequencies along with a number of low-power FM repeaters:

2WPR 95.9 and 107.1 FM
2BY  657 AM
2WA 1584 AM

References

See also
 List of radio stations in Australia

Western Plains
Radio stations in New South Wales
Radio stations established in 1993
1993 establishments in Australia